Sint Maarten is a constituent country of the Kingdom of the Netherlands.

Sint Maarten, Sint-Maarten or Sint Martinus may also refer to:

 Sint Maarten, North Holland, a village in the Netherlands
 Saint Martin (island), an island in the Caribbean
 Martin of Tours, French saint
 St. Martin's Day, a holiday celebrated in Belgium and the Netherlands
 Sint Martinus, Didam, a tower mill in the Netherlands
 Sint-Maartenscollege, a school in Maastricht, Netherlands
 AZ Sint-Maarten, a hospital in Mechelen, Belgium

See also
 Saint Martin (disambiguation)
 San Martín (disambiguation)
 Sankt Martin (disambiguation)
 São Martinho (disambiguation)